Shunzei-kyō Waji Sōjō (俊成卿和字奏状), also known as Shōji Ninen Shunzei-kyō Waji Sōjō (正治二年俊成卿和字奏状), is a Japanese work of poetic criticism (karon) dealing with waka poetry. It was written by the poet and courtier Fujiwara no Shunzei between the seventh and eighth months of the second year of Shōji (1200).

Title 
The work of poetic criticism composed by Fujiwara no Shunzei in the late summer of 1200 is formally known as Shōji Ninen Shunzei-kyō Waji Sōjō, literally signifying "a document submitted to the emperor (sōjō) in Japanese characters (waji) by Shunzei in the second year of Shōji". This title is variously abbreviated to Shōji Ninen Sōjō, Shōji Ninen Waji Sōjō, Shōji Sōjō, Shunzei-kyō Waji Sōjō, and so on.

Authorship and date 
As is made clear from the title, the work was composed by the courtier, poet and scholar Fujiwara no Shunzei. Shunzei wrote it between the 26th day of the seventh month and the eighth day of the eighth month of Shōji 2 (or, between 6 September and 17 September 1200 according to the Julian calendar).

This date is established from references in the Maigetsushō, the diary kept by Shunzei's son Teika, which recounts that on the 15th day of the seventh month he heard tell from his brother-in-law, Saionji Kintsune, of a poetry competition to be hosted by Retired Emperor Go-Toba. According to the entry for the 18th, Teika was initially meant to be included, but that due to the machinations of  only poets of a certain age and over were to be allowed participate. Teika was naturally upset at this.

Contents 
In the treatise, Shunzei gives examples of similar poetry gatherings in the past where there were no age limitations, and in addition to giving his own views on waka composition he praises the progressive style of waka composition employed by his son.

References

Citations

Works cited 

 
 
 

Karon (waka)